The 1946 Central Michigan Chippewas football team represented Central Michigan College of Education, later renamed Central Michigan University, as an independent during the 1946 college football season.  In their 10th and final season under head coach Ron Finch, the Chippewas compiled a 6–2 record, shut out three opponents (Bowling Green, Northern Michigan, and Great Lakes NTS), and outscored all opponents by a combined total of 240 to 67. The team played its home games at Alumni Field in Mount Pleasant, Michigan.

Ron Finch was the team's head coach.  Lawrence "Doc" Sweeney was the line coach, and Lyle Bennett was the assistant coach in charge of the ends, kickers, and the "B" team.

Coach Finch retired as the school's head football coach in January 1947 to devote his efforts to his position as the head of the college's physical education department. In 10 years as the school's head football coach, Finch compiled a 54–18–1 record.

Schedule

References

Central Michigan
Central Michigan Chippewas football seasons
Central Michigan Chippewas football